The Groen ShadowHawk was a proposed American autogyro that was under development in the mid-2010s by Groen Aeronautics of Midvale, Utah for the surveillance role. The aircraft was intended to be supplied complete and ready-to-fly.

Active in 2015, by November 2017 the project's webpage had been taken down and development has probably ended.

Design and development
The ShadowHawk was based upon the earlier Groen Hawk 4 and its successful employment in the surveillance role at the 2002 Winter Olympics in Salt Lake City.

The design was to feature a single main rotor, a two-seats-in side-by-side configuration enclosed cockpit with a bubble canopy, tricycle landing gear, plus dual tail casters and pusher configuration engine. The design includes a two-bladed rotor and a four-bladed pusher propeller.

Specifications (ShadowHawk)

See also
List of rotorcraft

References

External links
Artist's conception of the ShadowHawk
ShadowHawk
Abandoned civil aircraft projects of the United States
Single-engined pusher autogyros